Banque Zitouna is the first Islamic bank in Tunisia and the Maghreb region (North Africa) with the capital of $30 million, aiming at developing Islamic loan and saving products for businesses and individuals.

Banque Zitouna was established in 2009 by the Tunisian businessman, Mohamed Sakher El Materi, Chairman of Princesse El Materi Holdings.

The Islamic Bank of Zitouna plans to grow by 20 branches per year and hopes to expand from Tunisia into neighbouring countries."

References

External links

  Banque Zitouna (official homepage)

2009 establishments in Tunisia
Banks of Tunisia
Banks established in 2009
Islamic banks
Organisations based in Tunis
Economy of Tunis